Head On is an arcade video game developed by Sega/Gremlin and released by Sega in 1979. It's the first maze game where the goal is to run over dots. Designed by Lane Hauck at Sega/Gremlin in the United States, the game was a commercial success, becoming the fourth highest-grossing 1979 in both Japan and the US.

Sega released a sequel, Head On Part II, later the same year. The original inspired a number of clones, as well as Namco's Rally-X (1980).

Gameplay

Two cars continuously drive forward through rectangular channels in a simple maze. At the four cardinal directions are gaps where a car can change lanes. The player goal is to collect all dots in the maze while avoiding collisions with the computer-controlled car that is travelling in the opposite direction.

Development
The game was developed by Sega/Gremlin in the United States, where it was designed by Lane Hauck. He came up with the concept in 1978, roughly around the time that Sega purchased Gremlin Industries. After the acquisition, a veteran Sega engineer in Japan had a look at a prototype of Head On and was interested. Hauck's original game design included a timer. At the time, Taito's Space Invaders had introduced the concept of "going round after round" so the Sega engineer suggested to Hauck that he should get rid of the timer and replace it with a Space Invaders like round-after-round concept, which Hauck subsequently implemented and later said was "a key to making the game big." After the game was complete, Sega marketed the game in Japan, while Gremlin in turn marketed Sega games such as Monaco GP in North America.

Reception
Head On was a commercial success in arcades. In Japan, it became Gremlin's most successful export. It was Japan's fourth highest-grossing arcade game of 1979, below Space Invaders, Galaxian and Sega's Monaco GP. Head On was also the fourth highest-earning arcade video game of 1979 in the United States, below Space Invaders, Football and Sprint 2.

Legacy
Ports of Head On for the Commodore 64 and VIC-20 were released in 1982. In Japan, the game was released for the PC-8801 and Sharp MZ computers.  Head On later appeared in the Sega Saturn collection Sega Memorial Selection Vol.1 and in the PlayStation 2 collection Sega Ages Vol. 23.

Sequels
A similar sequel was released the same year as the original: Head On Part II, also known as Head On 2. Licensed clones were developed based on the title.

Namco's Rally-X was produced as a successor to Head On.

A spiritual successor, Pacar, was released for the SG-1000. It adds a faux 3D environment, multiple enemy cars that chase the player in varying ways, tunnels that exit the maze, and power pellets that are produced by the player to eliminate enemy cars. These additions make it more like a Pac-Man clone.

A mobile phone version of Head On was released exclusively in Japan through the Sonic Cafe, Puyo Puyo Sega, and Sega Ages portal during the 2000s.

Clones
Exidy's Crash was released in arcades the same year as Head On. It was the seventh highest-grossing arcade game of 1979 in the United States. Konami's Fast Lane arcade game, released in 1987, is a Head On clone with improved graphics and some additional features.

Head On proved a popular concept to clone for home systems. Clones include Car Wars for the TI-99/4A,  Killer Car for Spectravideo, Car Chase for the ZX Spectrum, Dodge 'Em for the Atari 2600, Dodge Racer for the Atari 8-bit family, and Tunnels of Fahad for the TRS-80.

References

1979 video games
Arcade video games
Racing video games
Maze games
Sega arcade games
Sega Games franchises
Multiplayer and single-player video games
Gremlin Industries games
Commodore 64 games
VIC-20 games
Video games developed in the United States